Rise is the debut studio album by English Gothic rock band Nosferatu. It was released in June 1993 in the United States and Canada, and May 1993 in the United Kingdom and Germany. It is the band's best selling album with sales over 14,700.

Track listing

Personnel
Louis DeWray: Vocals 
Vlad Janicek: Bass Guitar, keyboards & drum machine programming
Damien DeVille: Lead Guitar & drum machine programming

1993 debut albums
Nosferatu (band) albums
Cleopatra Records albums